Baenan (Baenã, Baenán, Baena) is a poorly attested language of Brazil.  The last remaining speaker lived in Bahia, Brazil in 1940.  The language of this speaker was associated with the Baenan language as the last members of the Baenan tribe lived in Paragaçú, Bahia, near where the language was attested.

Vocabulary
There are nine known words of Baenan:

eželẽ - deer
bakurí - venison
kelemés - fire
patarak - jaguar
kadašužé - black person
bonikro - pig
pititiɲga - rat
pitirát - monkey
šẽšẽ - bull

References

Unclassified languages of South America
Extinct languages
Extinct languages of South America
Indigenous languages of Northeastern Brazil